The Houston Art Car Parade is an annual event in Houston, Texas, featuring a display of all types of rolling art.  The first and largest Art Car parade in the world, at any given parade spectators will see cars, bicycles, motorcycles, roller-skaters, and many other types of motorized and human-powered vehicles all decorated in various themes.  There are also classic cars, lowriders, and various other highly modified roadworthy vehicles.  The parade has been a Houston tradition since 1988, when 40 decorated vehicles were featured during the Houston International Festival.  The first art car parade took place on May 14, 1986, when 11 vehicles participated in a parade down Montrose Boulevard within the Neartown area.  In recent years, the parade has been held on Allen Parkway until the 2015 season prior to the re-routing of Allen Parkway where the westbound lanes have been converted into parking spaces; since 2016 the parade has been relocated to a section of Downtown Houston going up Smith Street with parade route going past Houston City Hall exiting westbound to Allen Parkway. The 2004 parade featured 250 entries observed by a live audience of over 100,000 people. There were over 260 entries in the 2006 parade.  The 2007 parade featured 282 entries. On November 28, 2009, Houston had an illuminated art car parade, dubbed Glowarama. Dan Aykroyd served as the Grand Marshal for the 2010 parade. 2020-21 saw no parades as the COVID-19 pandemic was to blame; the 35th parade returns come 2022.

See also
Art car
ArtCar Museum

References

External links
Official Art Car Parade website
The Houston Art Car Museum

Photo collections
2011 Parade (679 photos)
2005 Parade (120 photos)
2004 Parade (55 photos)
Art Car Museum

Art vehicles
Automotive events
Festivals in Houston
Outdoor sculptures in Texas
Parades in the United States
1986 establishments in Texas
Recurring events established in 1986
Arts in Houston